Antommarchi may refer to:

People
François Carlo Antommarchi (1780-1838), Napoleon's physician in his exile
Hortensia Antommarchi (1850-1915), Colombian poet, sister to Dorila & Elmira
Dorila Antommarchi (1853-1923), Colombian poet, sister to Hortensia & Elmira
Elmira Antommarchi (c.1850s-?), Colombian poet, sister to Hortensia & Dorila

Law
Antommarchi Rights